Yannick Quentrec (born 17 February 1962 in Paris) is a French former sprinter who competed primarily in the 400 metres. He represented at the 1984 and 1992 Summer Olympics, as well as two World Championships.

International competitions

Personal bests
Outdoor
200 metres – 20.96 (-0.6 m/s, Dijon 1986)
400 metres – 45.47 (Cologne 1986)

Indoor
200 metres – 23.09 (Madrid 1986)

References

All-Athletics profile

1962 births
Living people
Athletes from Paris
French male sprinters
Olympic athletes of France
Athletes (track and field) at the 1984 Summer Olympics
Athletes (track and field) at the 1992 Summer Olympics
World Athletics Championships athletes for France
Universiade medalists in athletics (track and field)
Universiade bronze medalists for France
20th-century French people
21st-century French people